Hotel Metropolitan is a historic hotel in Peducah, Kentucky that provided lodging for African Americans traveling through the area.

The Hotel was a stop on the Chitlin’ Circuit and was listed in the Green Book.

It now operates as the Hotel Metropolitan Museum.

History 
Hotel Metropolitan was built in 1909 by its owner, Maggie Steed, to accommodate guests who were denied lodging at white-owned hotels due to discriminatory laws and practices of the Jim Crow South.

Hotel guests included Louis Armstrong, Duke Ellington, Ella Fitzgerald, and Thurgood Marshall. Notable guests often gathered and performed in the hotel's Purple Room.

Steed died in 1924. Her son ran the hotel for a few years before selling it to Mamie Burbridge. In 1951, Burbridge sold it to the Gaines family whose son, Clarence “Big House” Gaines, donated it the Upper Town Heritage Foundation.

Purple Room 
The Purple Room, a freestanding building behind the hotel, was used as a gathering space and music venue. It was frequented by notable musicians staying in the Hotel.

Museum 
The Hotel now houses a museum dedicated to its history.

In 2021, the museum received a grant from the National Trust for Historic Preservation's African American Cultural Heritage action Fund for the purpose of restoring The Purple Room.

References 

Historic hotels in the United States
Buildings and structures in Paducah, Kentucky
African-American history of Kentucky
African-American museums in Kentucky
Museums in McCracken County, Kentucky
1909 establishments in Kentucky
Hotels in Kentucky
Hotel buildings completed in 1909